Artie Cobb (born November 17, 1942) is an American professional poker player, based in Las Vegas, Nevada.  Cobb began playing poker in New York, where he is originally from, and would later move to Las Vegas in 1976.

Poker career 
Cobb has won four bracelets at the World Series of Poker (WSOP), three of them in seven-card stud. To date, only one player has made more in WSOP stud events than Cobb.
 
He won his first bracelet in the 1983 WSOP $1,000 seven card stud event Hi-Lo event, defeating David Singer during the heads-up play. This was Cobb's first cash in any WSOP event.

Cobb won his second bracelet in 1987, defeating multi-bracelet winner Don Williams heads-up in a seven card stud event.  He later won two more bracelets at the WSOP, both in seven card stud events.

Cobb cashed in the $10,000 no limit Texas hold'em main event in 1986 (34th), 1987 (34th), and 1990 (28th).

As of 2011, his total live tournament winnings exceed $1,550,000.

World Series of Poker Bracelets

Notes

1942 births
American poker players
Living people
World Series of Poker bracelet winners
Super Bowl of Poker event winners